2,4-dienoyl-CoA reductase 1 is a protein that in humans is encoded by the DECR1 gene.

Function

This gene encodes an accessory enzyme which participates in the beta-oxidation and metabolism of unsaturated fatty enoyl-CoA esters.

See also 
 DECR2

References

Further reading